The Grammy Award for Best Original Jazz Composition was awarded from 1961 to 1967.  In 1961 the award was called the Grammy Award for Best Jazz Composition of More Than Five Minutes Duration.  The award was presented to the composer of the music.

Years reflect the year in which the Grammy Awards were presented, for works released in the previous year.

Recipients

References

Sources
Grammy Awards – Past Winners SearchAs noted in this article: search years are offset by one year.

Grammy Awards for jazz
Awards established in 1961
Awards established in 1967